Henry Richard Budgen (4 July 1865 – 13 March 1929) was an English cricketer. Budgen was a right-handed batsman, although his bowling style is unknown. He was born at Brighton, Sussex.

Budgen made his first-class debut for Sussex against the Marylebone Cricket Club at Lord's in 1886. He made nine further first-class appearances for the county, the last of which came against Somerset at the County Ground, Taunton, in the 1892 County Championship. In his ten first-class matches, he scored a total of 120 runs at an average of 7.50, with a high score of 32.

He died at Ilford, Essex, on 13 March 1929.

References

External links
Henry Budgen at ESPNcricinfo
Henry Budgen at CricketArchive

1865 births
1929 deaths
Sportspeople from Brighton
English cricketers
Sussex cricketers